Harry Peter Larson, III (born May 30, 1944) is a former American football running back in the National Football League for the Washington Redskins.  He played high school football for the Paxton Mustangs in Paxton, Illinois, one year for the Loomis School(Windsor, Ct) Pelicans and college football at Cornell University.  During his senior year at Cornell, Larson was elected to the Sphinx Head Society.

1944 births
Living people
Players of American football from Wilmington, Delaware
American football running backs
Cornell Big Red football players
Washington Redskins players
Loomis Chaffee School alumni